Matthew Aurel Brash (born May 12, 1998) is a Canadian professional baseball pitcher for the Seattle Mariners of Major League Baseball (MLB). He made his MLB debut in 2022.

Amateur career
Brash attended Bayridge Secondary School in Kingston, Ontario. Undrafted out of high school in 2016, he attended Niagara University in Lewiston, New York to play college baseball for the Purple Eagles. He was drafted by the San Diego Padres in the fourth round of the 2019 Major League Baseball draft.

Professional career

San Diego Padres
Brash made his professional debut in 2019 with the Arizona League Padres and Fort Wayne TinCaps, posting a combined 1.69 ERA over  innings. Brash did not play in 2020 due to the cancellation of the Minor League Baseball season because of the COVID-19 pandemic.

Seattle Mariners
On September 17, 2020, Brash was traded to the Seattle Mariners as the player to be named later for in a previous trade for Taylor Williams. Brash split the 2021 season between the Everett AquaSox and the Arkansas Travelers, going a combined 6–4 with a 2.31 ERA and 142 strikeouts over  innings. While pitching for the Travelers on August 2, he threw six innings of a combined no-hitter along with Nate Fisher and Dayeison Arias.

On September 28, 2021, Seattle selected Brash's contract to the 40-man roster and promoted him to the major leagues for the first time, although he did not make an appearance. On April 2, 2022, the Mariners announced that Brash would be the team's fifth starter in the rotation. He made his MLB debut on April 12.

References

External links

Niagara Purple Eagles bio

1998 births
Living people
Baseball people from Ontario
Sportspeople from Kingston, Ontario
Major League Baseball players from Canada
Canadian expatriate baseball players in the United States
Major League Baseball pitchers
Seattle Mariners players
Niagara Purple Eagles baseball players
Arizona League Padres players
Fort Wayne TinCaps players
Everett AquaSox players
Arkansas Travelers players
Tacoma Rainiers players
2023 World Baseball Classic players